Mecynoptera Schaus, 1913 is a synonym of either of two genera of moths in the family Erebidae and subfamily Calpinae:

Radara Walker, 1862
Cecharismena Möschler, 1890